Vreni Eberle (born 13 November 1950 in Munich) is a German former swimmer who competed in the 1968 Summer Olympics and in the 1972 Summer Olympics.

References

1950 births
Living people
German female swimmers
German female breaststroke swimmers
Olympic swimmers of West Germany
Swimmers at the 1968 Summer Olympics
Swimmers at the 1972 Summer Olympics
Olympic bronze medalists for West Germany
Olympic bronze medalists in swimming
Sportspeople from Munich
Medalists at the 1972 Summer Olympics